Clinidium dubium is a species of ground beetle in the subfamily Rhysodinae. It was described by Antoine Henri Grouvelle in 1903. It is known from Loja, Ecuador. The holotype measures  in length.

References

Clinidium
Beetles of South America
Invertebrates of Ecuador
Beetles described in 1903